Latex allergy is a medical term encompassing a range of allergic reactions to the proteins present in natural rubber latex.  It generally develops after repeated exposure to products containing natural rubber latex. When latex-containing medical devices or supplies come in contact with mucous membranes, the membranes may absorb latex proteins. In some susceptible people, the immune system produces antibodies that react immunologically with these antigenic proteins.  Many items contain or are made from natural rubber, including shoe soles, pen grips, hot water bottles, elastic bands, rubber gloves, condoms, baby-bottle nipples, and balloons; consequently, there are many possible routes of exposure that may trigger a reaction. People with latex allergies may also have or develop allergic reactions to some fruits, such as bananas.

Signs and symptoms 
Allergic reactions to latex range from Type I hypersensitivity, the most serious form of reaction, to Type IV hypersensitivity. Rate of onset is directly proportional to the degree of allergy: Type I responses will begin showing symptoms within minutes of exposure to latex, while Type IV responses may take hours or days to appear.

Most commonly, latex allergy presents with hives at the point of contact, followed by rhinitis. The most common physiological reaction to latex exposure is dermatitis at the point of contact, which gives way to soreness, itching, and redness. Angioedema is also a common response to oral, vaginal, or rectal contact.

Symptoms of more severe hypersensitivity include both local and generalized hives; feelings of faintness or impending doom; angioedema; nausea and vomiting; abdominal cramps; rhinitis; bronchospasm; and anaphylaxis. Type IV responses typically include erythema, blistering (forming vesicles and papules), itching, and crusting at the point of contact. This irritant contact dermatitis is considered a nonimmune reaction to latex. The degree of reaction is directly proportional to the duration of exposure, as well as skin temperature.

Among those with a latex allergy, 40% will experience irritant contact dermatitis; 33.1% will experience a Type I allergic reaction; 20.4% will experience Type IV allergic contact dermatitits; and 6.5% will experience both Type I and Type IV symptoms.

Causes

Occupational exposure 
Compared to the general population, occupational populations that frequently utilize latex gloves as barrier protection (such as healthcare professionals and hospital staff) see disproportionately high levels of allergy. Workers in these environments are exposed to latex allergens both through direct skin contact and from contaminated aerosolized powder from gloves, toy balloons, or any other dusted latex material. Occupational settings where employees are frequently putting on and pulling off powdered latex gloves, such as hospitals and other health care settings, increase the rate of airborne latex allergens and subsequent sensitivity. Hospital workers are particularly at risk due to the prevalence of latex not just in gloves but in a number of other hospital implements, such as tourniquets, elastic bandages, bag valve masks, and urinary catheters. Other occupations that see increased exposure to latex gloves and other supplies, and have higher rates of latex allergy or irritation compared to the general population, include hairdressers, housekeeping personnel, food service workers, and manufacturers in the industrial rubber industry.

Alternative latex exposure 
While most reported allergic reactions to latex have occurred in medical settings, non-healthcare workers show similar levels of latex antibodies, suggesting that they are sensitized to natural rubber latex through other sources, both inside the home and as medical patients. In particular, individuals with chronic health concerns that lead to repeated surgeries or catheterizations thus experience greater exposure to latex allergens and may develop an allergy. Outside of hospital environments, latex allergy may develop in amateur and professional athletes whose sports equipment includes natural rubber, such as swimsuits or running shoes. Rubber basketballs, in particular, may lead to contact dermatitis on the hands and fingertips. The sensitization to latex in athletes may be accelerated by the use of topical analgesics and other agents that diminish the skin barrier and increase contact. It has also been hypothesized that young children may develop a latex allergy due to exposure in the home and school environment from objects such as rubber balloons, boots, gloves, and toys.

Spina bifida 
People with spina bifida often have latex allergies. Up to 68% of children with this condition will have a reaction to latex.

Related allergies 
People who have latex allergy also may have or develop an allergic response to some plants and/or products of these plants (such as fruits). This is known as the latex-fruit syndrome. Fruits (and seeds) involved in this syndrome include banana, avocado, chestnut, kiwifruit, mango, passionfruit, fig, strawberry, papaya, apple, melon, celery, potato, tomato, carrot, and soy. The proteins in these fruits are similar to latex proteins.
Hevein-like protein domains  are a possible cause for allergen cross-reactivity between latex and banana or fruits in general.

Natural rubber latex contains several conformational epitopes located on several enzymes such as Hev b 1, Hev b 2, Hev b 4, Hev b 5 and Hev b 6.02.

FITkit is a latex allergen testing method for quantification of the major natural rubber latex (NRL) specific allergens: Hev b 1, Hev b 3, Hev b 5, and Hev b 6.02.

Prevention
The most effective form of primary prevention towards latex sensitization is limiting or completely avoiding contact with latex, particularly among children with risk factors such as spina bifida. The limitation of powdered latex glove use in hospital settings has also proven an effective primary prevention strategy among adult health care workers, and as secondary prevention for sensitized individuals.

Epidemiology
Latex allergy is uncommon in the general population, at least compared to high-risk groups such as hospital workers and spina bifida patients. Estimates suggest a worldwide prevalence of around 4.3% among the general population. Between 1% and 6% of the general population in the United States has latex allergy; assays of antibody levels in the blood suggest that 2.7 million to 16 million Americans are affected by some form of latex sensitivity. Females are approximately three times as likely as males to have latex allergies. Possible risk factors for the female population include increased employment in high-risk occupations and enhanced histamine release caused by female hormones.

Alternatives
Alternatives to latex include:
Synthetic rubbers (such as elastane, neoprene, nitrile) and artificially synthesized polyisoprene latex, which do not contain the proteins from the Hevea brasiliensis tree.
Products made from guayule natural rubber emulsions, which also do not contain the proteins from the Hevea rubber tree, and do not cause allergy in persons sensitized to Hevea proteins.
Alternative materials like Vytex Natural Rubber Latex which reduce exposure to latex allergens while otherwise retaining the properties of natural rubber; these are made using chemical treatment to reduce the amount of antigenic proteins in Hevea latex.
Polyurethane. 
The first polyurethane condoms, designed for people with latex allergies, were produced in 1994.

Some people are so sensitive that they may still have a reaction to replacement products made from alternative materials. This can occur when the alternative products are manufactured in the same facility as latex-containing products, leaving trace quantities of natural rubber latex on the non-latex products.

See also 
 Food allergy
 Food intolerance
 List of allergies
 Oral allergy syndrome

References

External links 

The American Latex Allergy Association
UK Latex Allergy Support Group
Asthma and Allergy Foundation of America

Allergology
Sensitivities
Rubber properties
Occupational safety and health